Križevci is a city in central Croatia with a total population of 21,122 and with 11,231 in the city itself (2011), the oldest city in its county, the Koprivnica-Križevci County.

History

The first mention of the so-called Upper Križevac was from 1193 by Béla III, obtaining the status of Royal Borough in 1252 by the ban Stephan which was confirmed by King Béla IV a year later.
The so-called Lower Križevac developed somewhat slower than its twin town: it became a free royal town in 1405, thanks to king Sigismund.

Bloody Sabor of Križevci was organised killing of the Croatian ban Stjepan Lacković and his followers by king Holy Roman Emperor Sigismund, on 27 February 1397.

Križevac was the birthplace of a Catholic priest Marko who died at the hand of Calvinists in Košice in 1619, and was subsequently canonized because of his martyrdom. This event is commemorated every September 7 in Križevci.

After centuries of division, empress Maria Theresa of Austria united the Lower and Upper Križevac into Križevci in 1752 (the word Križevci is plural of Križevac). The town was also hit by the wars with the Turks, but it regained importance in 1871 when the railway was built through it on the way from Budapest to Rijeka.

In the late 19th century and early 20th century, Križevci was a district capital in the Bjelovar-Križevci County of the Kingdom of Croatia-Slavonia.

These days the town is pretty much oriented towards mass entrepreneurship, but it still enjoys the greatest number of valuable and oldest monuments in the county (both in the town and its surroundings).

Križevci has nine churches (seven Catholic, a Serbian Orthodox and a Greek Catholic), some of them built in the Middle Ages. In the oldest Gothic Church of Saint Cross in Križevci, there are important Baroque pictures and a marble altar dating from the 18th century (by Francesco Robba). Also interesting is the parish church of St. Anne from the 17th century.

Of particular note is the Greek Catholic Cathedral of the Holy Trinity, the seat of the Eparchy of Križevci since 1789. The cathedral building was worked on by some of Zagreb's finest architects: its facade was rebuilt by Bartol Felbinger in 1817 while an internal reconstruction was performed in the Gothic revival style by Hermann Bolle in 1892-97. The iconostasis and the pictures on the walls are works of famous Croatian painters including Ivan Tišov, Celestin Medović and Bela Čikoš-Sesija.

Križevci Synagogue was built in 1895. After renovation in 2014 it mainly serves as Tourist Information Centre. The city museum exhibits a rich archeological, ethnographic and cultural-historical collection.

The main town manifestation is called Križevačko veliko spravišče, commemorated yearly, when the local cultural traditions are displayed during a fiesta that lasts throughout the first full weekend of July. According to legend, this feast originates from a 14th-century feast of reconciliation between the previously hostile communities of merchants from the towns of Križevac and the nobility from the nearby Kalnik hillside.

Geography
Križevci is a city in Koprivnica-Križevci County. Because of its nearness to Zagreb (57 km), Križevci is developing like a satellite city. It has a good position because it's close to all regional centers: Koprivnica (31 km), Bjelovar (33 km) and Varaždin (48 km). Very important fact for establishing the city was its macro traffical position. This place was known already in antics and Middle Ages because that was where the main caravan roads crossed, and there was a famous king's Coloman road that was going through Križevci. That road was connecting Pannonia and Dalmatia. In its closer past, many roads and other types of traffic connections were built: Many macadamized roads that connects Posavina, region around Kalnik and Podravina (there were all already finished in the 18th century), the railroad from Hungary to Zagreb, that goes through Koprivnica and Križevci (1870.), and to Bjelovar (1894). Today, city is still important because it connects Bjelovar and Koprivnica, big regional centers, and because it's the place where many regional roads starts from direction of Bjelovar, Gornja Rijeka and Sudovec, valley of the river Bednja, zelinsko prigorje over Čanjevo and from Rasinja over Apatovec. Križevci lies on 140 m above the level of the sea, where the southern part of Kalnik begins.

Topographically, it lies on Pleistocene surface, between swamped alluvial valleys of the brook Vrtlin from the east and the brook Koruska from the west. Relief, geological-petrografical structure, convenient climate and abundance of water, all these were elements of economical and demographic development of the city. Modern demographic-economical transformation has changed relations in space and structure of population, and it is observable through processes of deagrarianization, industrialization and deruralization. This effected with abandoning agricultural production, abandoning villages and moving to Križevci.

Climate

Demographics
According to the 2011 census, Croats form an absolute majority at 96.6% with Serbs making up for 2.1% of the population.

The list of settlements in the administrative area of Križevci is:

 Apatovec, population 350
 Beketinec, population 38
 Bojnikovec, population 219
 Bukovje Križevačko, population 316
 Carevdar, population 438
 Cubinec, population 546
 Čabraji, population 153
 Dijankovec, population 188
 Doljanec, population 53
 Donja Brčkovčina, population 165
 Donja Glogovnica, population 129
 Donji Dubovec, population 34
 Đurđic, population 267
 Erdovec, population 207
 Gornja Brčkovčina, population 160
 Gornja Glogovnica, population 115
 Gornji Dubovec, population 8
 Gračina, population 209
 Ivanec Križevački, population 308
 Jarčani, population 97
 Karane, population 229
 Kloštar Vojakovački, population 366
 Kostadinovac, population 14
 Križevci, population 11,231
 Kučari, population 31
 Kunđevec, population 11
 Lemeš, population 111
 Lemeš Križevački, population 183
 Majurec, population 423
 Male Sesvete, population 46
 Mali Carevdar, population 19
 Mali Potočec, population 169
 Mali Raven, population 15
 Marinovec, population 103
 Mičijevac, population 69
 Novaki Ravenski, population 178
 Novi Bošnjani, population 81
 Novi Đurđic, population 130
 Osijek Vojakovački, population 205
 Pavlovec Ravenski, population 101
 Pesek, population 271
 Pobrđani Vojakovački, population 35
 Podgajec, population 21
 Poljana Križevačka, population 396
 Povelić, population 86
 Prikraj Križevački, population 194
 Ruševac, population 182
 Srednji Dubovec, population 93
 Stara Ves Ravenska, population 31
 Stari Bošnjani, population 105
 Sveta Helena, population 309
 Sveti Martin, population 91
 Špiranec, population 151
 Većeslavec, population 143
 Velike Sesvete, population 87
 Veliki Potočec, population 399
 Veliki Raven, population 219
 Vojakovac, population 234
 Vujići Vojakovački, population 57
 Žibrinovec, population 113

Education
Križevci is home to the Križevci College of Agriculture, founded in 1860 as the Royal Agriculture and Forestry College.

Culture
Križevci is home to a monument to the 37 people from the city who died in the Croatian War of Independence entitled the Mother of the Dead Hero.

Notable people

 Dubravko Detoni - composer
 Ivan Andrija Makar - 17th century Croatian and Habsburg soldier
 Julije Drohobeczky - bishop
 Sidonija Rubido - first Croatian opera singer
 Branko Hrg - politician
 Dora Kalaus - handball player
 Larissa Kalaus
 Marcel Kiepach - inventor
 Marko Krizin - catholic saint
 Franjo Marković - writer
 Antun Nemčić - writer
 Dragutin Novak
 Vanessa Radman
 Alfred Švarc
 Marko Tomas - basketball player
 Ljudevit Vukotinović
 Branko Zorko
 Drago Grdenić
 Antonio Radić (born 1987), known for his YouTube chess channel 'agadmator'.
 Magda Logomer, herbalist.

See also 

 Roman Catholic Diocese of Bjelovar-Križevci
 Eparchy of Križevci

References

External links
 Križevci official site
 News Portal of Križevci
 Open University Križevci
 History, culture, locations, personage of Križevci in multimedia

 
Cities and towns in Croatia
Populated places in Koprivnica-Križevci County
Bjelovar-Križevci County
Forestry in Croatia
12th-century establishments in Croatia
1193 establishments in Europe